Los hijos de nadie (English title: Nobody's Children) is a Mexican juvenile telenovela produced by Irene Sabido for Televisa in 1997. This telenovela was a way to raise awareness among society regarding the serious issue of street children. This telenovela was supported by UNICEF.

On February 24, 1997, Canal de las Estrellas started broadcasting Los hijos de nadie weekdays at 5:00pm, replacing Luz Clarita. The last episode was broadcast on June 20, 1997 with El alma no tiene color replacing it the following day.

Silvia Derbez, Alpha Acosta, Ramón Abascal, and Rossie Montenegro starred as protagonists, while Yolanda Andrade starred as the main antagonist.

Cast 
 
Silvia Derbez as Doña Leonor
Alpha Acosta as Verónica
Ramón Abascal as Francisco
Rossie Montenegro as Rosi/Angelita
Yolanda Andrade as Lucila Villarreal
Miguel Ángel Ghigliazza as Justino
Ricardo Blume as Don Chuy
Tere Velázquez as Tere
Martha Ofelia Galindo as Celes
Rosa de Castilla as Amparo
Jorge Antolín as Vinicio
Claudia Vega as Brenda
Juan Carlos Barreto as Felipe
Sergio Sendel as Mauricio
Mariana Seoane as Carolina
Evelyn Solares as Mela
Carola Vázquez as Micaela
Fabiola Campomanes as Lourdes
Marco Zapata as Charal
Goyo as Triques
Yamiro as Muelas
Alondra Torres as Pelos
Luis Daniel as Luis
Liuba de Lasse as Almendra
Ulises Pliego as Miguel Ángel (child)
Germán Robles as Germán
Jorge del Campo as Antenor Villarreal
Luis Cárdenas as Pablo
Rocío Sobrado as Melisa
Estela Barona as Evelia
Sergio Acosta as Arturo
Maripaz García as Sandra
Lucía Paillés as Otilia
Ricardo de Pascual as Rosendo
Arturo García Tenorio as Roberto
Roberto Sen as José
Amelia Zapata as Emma
Zayda Castellón as Tres Vueltas
Malusa Munguía as Jose/Josefina
Magda Karina as Yolanda
Lourdes Canale as Martha
Renata Flores as Teacher

References

External links

1997 telenovelas
Mexican telenovelas
1997 Mexican television series debuts
1997 Mexican television series endings
Spanish-language telenovelas
Television shows set in Mexico
Televisa telenovelas
Children's telenovelas